John Nobbs (8 September 1845 – 11 November 1921) was an Australian politician.

He was born at Surry Hills to John and Jane Nobbs; his father was a gardener. He attended Sydney Grammar School and then farmed at Colo, also founding the Cumberland Independent newspaper. On 16 December 1865 he married Louisa Smedley; they had twelve children. In 1888 he was elected to the New South Wales Legislative Assembly as the Free Trade member for Central Cumberland; he resigned in 1893 facing bankruptcy and lost the subsequent by-election. He returned to the Assembly in 1898 as the member for Granville. He held that seat as a Liberal until his defeat in 1913. He was subsequently a member of the New South Wales Legislative Council from 1917 to 1921. Nobbs died at Granville in 1921.

References

 

1845 births
1921 deaths
Free Trade Party politicians
Members of the New South Wales Legislative Assembly
Members of the New South Wales Legislative Council
Nationalist Party of Australia members of the Parliament of New South Wales
Mayors of places in New South Wales